Starship is an American hard rock band from San Francisco, California. Formed as a successor to Jefferson Starship, the group originally featured vocalists Mickey Thomas and Grace Slick, guitarist Craig Chaquico, bassist Pete Sears, drummer Donny Baldwin and keyboardist David Freiberg – all were members of Jefferson Starship until October 1984, when rhythm guitarist and vocalist Paul Kantner (who had left in June) sued the band for the use of the name, forcing them to begin operating as simply Starship. Freiberg left shortly after the group's formation, however, due to the dominance of keyboards in the band's sound. Sears left early into sessions for the group's second album No Protection, citing an opposition to the band's continued evolution into what he described as a "vacuous, sterilized, escapist" musical style.

Slick also departed Starship in early 1988, leaving Thomas as the band's sole lead vocalist. Bassist Brett Bloomfield and keyboardist Mark Morgan were added to the group's lineup in time for the recording of Love Among the Cannibals, having both performed as touring members since the previous year. Baldwin was next to leave, after seriously injuring Thomas in a bar fight before a show on September 24, 1989; the fight was initially not revealed to involve the drummer, but within a few weeks of the incident he was dismissed from the group. Once the vocalist had recovered, the tour resumed in early 1990 with Kenny Stavropoulos on drums. After the tour's conclusion in the summer of 1990, Chaquico, Bloomfield, Morgan, and Stavropoulos left the band. Thomas added producer Peter Wolf on keyboards and continued to record by utilizing session musicians. After the release of the greatest hits compilation Greatest Hits (Ten Years and Change 1979–1991) in the spring of 1991, the band was let go by RCA. Starship became inactive at this time.

In early 1992, Thomas reformed the band under the name "Mickey Thomas' Starship" (later "Starship featuring Mickey Thomas"), with a lineup also including guitarist Jeff Tamelier, bassist Bobby Vega, drummer T. Moran, keyboardist John Lee Sanders, saxophonist Bill Slais, trumpeter Max Haskett and former touring vocalist Melisa Kary. The following year, Vega was replaced by the returning Bloomfield. In 1995, Darrell Verdusco replaced Moran on drums. Sanders, Slais and Haskett also left in 1995, with Phil Bennett taking over on keyboards. Tamelier was replaced by Erik Torjesen in 1996, who performed with the group until 2000 when he was diagnosed with cancer (he died the following March). John Garnache replaced Bloomfield on bass in 1997. Torjesen was replaced by Mark Abrahamian in 2000, while Jeff Adams replaced Garnache the same year. Stephanie Calvert joined in 2006. Abrahamian died on September 2, 2012 after suffering a heart attack after a show. He was replaced the following month by Winger guitarist John Roth. In September 2021, vocalist Cian Coey replaced Calvert.

Members

Current

Former

Lineups

Timeline

See also
List of Jefferson Airplane members
List of Jefferson Starship members

References

External links
Starship official website

Starship